Akilong Diabone (born 1955) is a Senegalese judoka. He competed at the 1980 Summer Olympics and the 1988 Summer Olympics.

References

1955 births
Living people
Senegalese male judoka
Olympic judoka of Senegal
Judoka at the 1980 Summer Olympics
Judoka at the 1988 Summer Olympics
Place of birth missing (living people)
African Games medalists in judo
Competitors at the 1987 All-Africa Games
African Games gold medalists for Senegal